John Gleason Cramer, Jr. (born October 24, 1934) is a Professor Emeritus of Physics at the University of Washington in Seattle, Washington, known for his development of the Transactional Interpretation of Quantum Mechanics. He has been an active participant with the STAR (Solenoidal Tracker At RHIC) Experiment at the Relativistic Heavy Ion Collider (RHIC) at Brookhaven National Laboratory, and the particle accelerator at CERN in Geneva, Switzerland.

Early years
John Cramer was born in Houston, Texas. He attended Mirabeau B Lamar High School  in  Houston, and graduated with a BA in Physics from Rice University in 1957. He continued his studies, graduating with an MA in Physics from Rice University in 1959 and a Ph.D. in Physics from Rice University in 1961.

Career
After serving as a post-doctoral fellow at Indiana University from 1961 to 1963, Cramer continued as an assistant professor at the same university from 1963 to 1964. He was an assistant professor at the University of Washington from 1964 to 1968, an associate professor from 1968 to 1974, and was appointed as a full professor in 1974.

From 2007 to 2014, Cramer investigated the possibility that quantum nonlocality might be used for communication between observers through the use of switchable interference patterns. In the course of this work, he gained new understanding of the "show stopper" within the quantum formalism that prevents such nonlocal signaling: For each interference pattern, nature also provides and superimposes an "anti-interference pattern".  These are always combined in a way that "erases" potential nonlocal signals.  The two interference patterns complement each other, resulting in no perceptible interference pattern. Measurement changes can dramatically modify the individual interference patterns, but always so that this erasure occurs. In this way, nature is protected from the possibility of retrocausal signaling and its consequences and paradoxes.

Cramer has been making regular appearances on the Science Channel and on NPR Science Friday.

Writing
In addition to his approximately 300 scientific publications in peer-reviewed journals, John Cramer writes a regular column, "The Alternate View", appearing in every second issue, for Analog Science Fiction and Fact magazine. He also originated and published a paper on "The Transactional Interpretation of Quantum Mechanics" (TIQM) in July 1986, which was inspired from the Wheeler-Feynman Time-symmetric theory.

His book on quantum mechanics, The Quantum Handshake: Entanglement, Nonlocality and Transactions (2015), published by Springer Verlag, is a comprehensive introduction to the transactional interpretation.

Cramer's simulation of the sound of the Big Bang, created using Mathematica, attracted some mainstream press attention in late 2003 and again in 2013. The simulation originated with an "Alternate View" article, "BOOMERanG and the Sound of the Big Bang" (January 2001). Cramer describes the sound as "rather like a large jet plane 100 feet off the ground flying over your house in the middle of the night."

Cramer has published two novels, Twistor (1989) and Einstein's Bridge (1997), both within the hard science fiction genre.  Cramer was the 2010 Science Guest of Honor at Norwescon, a large science fiction and fantasy convention in the Seattle area.

Bibliography

Non-fiction
 

"Alternate View" columns in Analog
See also AV Columns Online

Novels

Awards and recognition
 Elected Fellow, American Association for the Advancement of Science (1991);
 Nominated for the John W. Campbell Award for Best New Writer (1991);
 Listed in Who's Who in America (from 43rd Edition, 1984);
 Elected Fellow, American Physical Society (1974);
 National Science Foundation Fellow at Rice University (1959–61);
 Sigma-Xi Thesis Award at Rice University (1959);
 Bausch-Lomb Science Award at Lamar High School Graduation (1953);

Personal life
Cramer married Pauline Ruth Bond in June, 1961. The couple have three children: Kathryn Cramer (born April, 1962), John G. Cramer III (born January 1964), and Karen Cramer (born April 1967).

See also
 Transactional Interpretation of Quantum Mechanics
 Wheeler–Feynman absorber theory

References

 Profile in Marquis Who's Who on the Web.

External links
 John G. Cramer's Home Page – Includes a photograph of the author, contact information, and more
  A Puzzling Signal in RHIC Experiments, Physics News Update Number 723 #2, March 15, 2005 by Phil Schewe & Ben Stein.
 
 Scientific publications of John G. Cramer on INSPIRE-HEP
 John G. Cramer, Professor Emeritus of Physics at the University of Washington, presents "The Quantum Handshake Explored." YouTube video dated 1 Feb 2018.

Cramer, John G.
20th-century American novelists
20th-century American male writers
20th-century American physicists
21st-century American novelists
21st-century American male writers
21st-century American physicists
American male non-fiction writers
American male novelists
American nuclear physicists
American science writers
American science fiction writers
Analog Science Fiction and Fact people
Brookhaven National Laboratory staff
Experimental physicists
Fellows of the American Association for the Advancement of Science
Lamar High School (Houston, Texas) alumni
Living people
Novelists from Texas
Novelists from Washington (state)
People associated with CERN
Academics from Houston
Quantum physicists
Rice University alumni
Scientists from Seattle
Scientists from Texas
Theoretical physicists
University of Washington faculty
Writers from Seattle
Writers from Houston
Writers from Washington (state)